Trent Jenkins is an American mixed martial artist. He competed in the Middleweight division. Jenkins also was in the first ever fight in UFC history losing to Jason DeLucia. In UFC 2 another alternate was trent jenkins. but didn't fight. it is showing UFC 2 ending credit. There was no alternate match because there was no time in the round of 16.

Mixed martial arts record

|-
| Loss
| align=center| 0–4
| Griffen Reynaud
| Submission (keylock)
| Rings USA: Rising Stars Block A
| 
| align=center| 1
| align=center| 2:27
| Orem, Utah, United States
| 
|-
| Loss
| align=center| 0–3
| Josh Reason
| TKO (punches)
| BRI 1: Bas Rutten Invitational 1
| 
| align=center| 1
| align=center| 4:49
| United States
| 
|-
| Loss
| align=center| 0–2
| Mark Hall
| Submission (armlock)
| UFC: Ultimate Ultimate 1995
| 
| align=center| 1
| align=center| 5:29
| Denver, Colorado, United States
| 
|-
| Loss
| align=center| 0–1
| Jason DeLucia
| Submission (rear-naked choke)
| UFC 1: The Beginning
| 
| align=center| 1
| align=center| 0:52
| Denver, Colorado, United States
|

See also
List of male mixed martial artists

References

External links
 
 
 Trent Jenkins at mixedmartialarts.com

American male mixed martial artists
Middleweight mixed martial artists
Mixed martial artists utilizing American Kenpo
Living people
Year of birth missing (living people)
Ultimate Fighting Championship male fighters